The Military Intelligence Board (MIB) serves as the senior-level board for coordination of intelligence assets in support of military operations globally within the United States Government. The board is chaired by the Defense Intelligence Agency, a component of the United States Department of Defense, and seeks consensus across commands, agencies, and services. It serves as  a forum to discuss any intelligence issues related to the military. 

During combat operations, the MIB meets almost daily to address and coordinate intelligence analysis, assets, collection, systems, and personnel.

The MIB consists of the following members:

Principal Members:
Director of the Defense Intelligence Agency (chair)
Deputy Director of the Defense Intelligence Agency
Director of the National Security Agency
Joint Staff J-2
Deputy Chief of Staff, G-2, US Army
Director of Naval Intelligence
HQ, US Air Force, Director of Intelligence, Surveillance and Reconnaissance
Director of Intelligence, HQ US Marine Corps
Director, National Geospatial-Intelligence Agency

Associated members:
Unified Combatant Command, J-2s
Director of the National Reconnaissance Office
Director, Policy Staff, Defense Intelligence Agency
Deputy Assistant Secretary of Defense for Intelligence and Security
Undersecretary of Defense for Intelligence
Assistant Commandant for Intelligence and Criminal Investigations, US Coast Guard
Joint Staff, J-3
Director, Directorate of Military Intelligence Staff
Defense Intelligence Functional Manager for Collection
Assistant, Deputy Director for Military Support, Central Intelligence Agency
Director, Defense Information Systems Agency

See also
National Intelligence Council
Director of National Intelligence

References

External links
Military Intelligence Board on the DIA web site (archived version)

United States intelligence agencies
Military intelligence
Defense Intelligence Agency
United States federal boards, commissions, and committees